Delphi ( or ;) is a locality in County Mayo, Ireland. Its English name was coined by the Marquis of Sligo, who built a famous hunting lodge there. 

It is located on the Owengar River that connects Fin Lough to Doo Lough, between the fjord of Killary Harbour to the south and the Sheeffry Hills to the north, in a valley surrounded by the Mweelrea Mountains and the neighbouring peaks of Ben Creggan and Ben Gorm. The R335 road passes through it.

References

See also
 List of towns and villages in Ireland

Towns and villages in County Mayo